Olan Mills, Inc. was a privately owned American company founded in 1932 by Olan Mills Sr. and Mary Mills which was headquartered in Chattanooga, Tennessee. It provided portrait photography and church directories through its two main corporate divisions: Olan Mills Portrait Studios and Olan Mills Church Division.

Its United Kingdom division, based in Northamptonshire and with numerous studios based in Mothercare stores, stopped trading on December 26, 2008. That was in preparation for the firm being placed into administration.

On November 9, 2011, Lifetouch Inc. announced that it had purchased the Olan Mills photography business, Olan Mills Church Directories and Olan Mills Portrait Studios, its corporate functions, and the production operations in Chattanooga. In January 2012, Lifetouch announced the closing of two of Olan Mills' three facilities in Chattanooga with 383 job losses.

References

Photography companies of the United States
Companies based in Chattanooga, Tennessee
Design companies established in 1932
1932 establishments in Tennessee
Design companies disestablished in 2011
2011 disestablishments in Tennessee
2011 mergers and acquisitions
Publishing companies established in 1932
Publishing companies disestablished in 2011